The Famous Players Film Company was a film company founded in 1912 by Adolph Zukor in partnership with the Frohman brothers, powerful New York City theatre impresario.

History
Discussions to form the company were held at The Lambs, a famous theater club where Charles and Daniel Frohman were members. The company advertised "Famous Players in Famous Plays" and its first release was the French film Les Amours de la reine Élisabeth (1912) starring Sarah Bernhardt and Lou Tellegen. Its first actual production was The Count of Monte Cristo (1912, released 1913), directed by Edwin S. Porter and starring James O'Neill, the father of dramatist Eugene O'Neill.

In 1914, the company purchased the former headquarters of New York City's Ninth Mounted Cavalry unit at 221 West 26th Street in Manhattan. The cavernous brick building made excellent filming space for Zukor, and the modernized site is still used today as Chelsea Television Studios.

Hiring its performers straight from the New York City stage, Famous Players had an early roster of some of the city's biggest names including Marguerite Clark, Hazel Dawn, and H. B. Warner. The company also featured cinema's biggest star of the era, Mary Pickford, and presented theater idol John Barrymore in his first two feature films. The company produced both short and feature-length productions. 

In 1916, the company merged with the Jesse L. Lasky Feature Play Company to form Famous Players-Lasky Corporation, which later became Paramount Pictures.

Famous Players Fiction Studios
In 1915, the company established Famous Players Fiction Studios at 5300 Melrose Avenue in Hollywood. The new studio's first film starred Mary Pickford. The studio later became Clune Studio, then California Studio, then Gross-Krasne, followed by Producers Studios Inc., and is now known as Raleigh Studios. Raleigh Studios is known for being the site of Gunsmoke, Perry Mason, and Let's Make a Deal. It is one of the oldest studios in Hollywood.

See also
 Famous Players theatres
 List of Paramount Pictures films

References

External links 
 Army Pictorial Center, built in 1919 as Famous Players Studio, now part of Kaufman Astoria Studios

American companies established in 1912
Entertainment companies established in 1912
Mass media companies established in 1912
Mass media companies disestablished in 1916
Silent film studios
Defunct American film studios
Film studios in Southern California
Defunct organizations based in Hollywood, Los Angeles
Paramount Pictures
Entertainment companies based in California
Defunct companies based in Greater Los Angeles
Articles containing video clips
1912 establishments in New York City
1916 disestablishments in California
Film production companies of the United States
American companies disestablished in 1916